The Aquatic Effect is a 2016 French-Icelandic comedy-drama film directed by Sólveig Anspach. It was screened in the Directors' Fortnight section at the 2016 Cannes Film Festival where it won the SACD Award. It won the César Award for Best Original Screenplay at the 42nd César Awards.

Cast
 Samir Guesmi as Samir
 Florence Loiret Caille as Agathe
 Philippe Rebbot as Reboute
 Estéban as Daniel
 Stéphane Soo Mongo as Youssef
 Olivia Côte as Corinne
 Ingvar Eggert Sigurðsson as Siggi

References

External links
 

2016 films
2016 drama films
2016 comedy films
2016 romantic comedy-drama films
French romantic comedy-drama films
2010s French-language films
Icelandic romantic comedy-drama films
Films directed by Sólveig Anspach
2010s French films